Elwyn (Jack) Lynn (6 November 1917 – 22 January 1997) was an Australian artist, author, art critic and curator.

Career 
Elwyn Lynn trained as a teacher, and was a schoolmaster in Sydney Secondary schools until 1968 (mainly English and history).  Lynn was self-taught as an artist.

Lynn was Curator of the Power Gallery of Contemporary Art at Sydney University from 1969 to 1983.  There he built up an international collection, which is now within the Sydney Museum of Contemporary Art.

Lynn was an art critic at The Australian for many years.  He was author of several books, including one about the artist Sir Sidney Nolan.

Alongside his career as a painter, which started in the mid-1940s, Lynn was also an outspoken commentator on the visual arts.  In the 1950s and 1960s he edited the Broadsheets of the Contemporary Art Society. He worked as a critic for a number of newspapers, including the Sunday Mirror (1963), The Bulletin (1966-1973), Nation (1969), The Australian (1964-1965) and The Weekend Australian.  In 1971 he became Advisory Editor of Art International.  For a short time he also edited Art and Australia.

Lynn was awarded Membership of the Order of Australia in 1975.  He won the Wynne Prize at the Art Gallery of NSW in 1988.  In 1989, he received an Honorary Doctor of Letters from the University of Sydney.  In 1994 he received the Emeritus Award from the Australia Council.

The Art 
Elwyn Lynn's work was striking, with the use of unconventional painting media and expressive surfaces to construct metaphors for human suffering and endurance.  Most of his work was essentially abstract, although a sense of the landscape is often evoked.

Emeritus Professor Peter Pinson noted:
The later work of Lynn maintained his interest in damaged and shredding surfaces, and his frequent and adventurousness use of assemblage elements.  These late works were also marked by an expressionist vehemence and a daring informality.

Prizes 
Elywn Lynn won the following prizes:
 1988 Wynne Prize AGNSW
 1987 University Of NSW Purchase Prize
 1983 Trustees' Watercolour Prize AGNSW
 1982 Awarded Atelier at Cite Internationale des Arts, Paris 
 1980 Trustees' Watercolour Prize AGNSW
 1957 Won Blake Prize for Religious Art, Mosman Art Prize and Bathurst Prize

Exhibitions 
Elwyn Lynn participated in over 150 group exhibitions in Australia, New Zealand, United Kingdom, Brazil, Indonesia, Poland and Germany.  He had over 50 solo exhibitions in Sydney, Newcastle, Brisbane, Melbourne, Adelaide, Perth and Cologne (Germany).
 
He has collections in the following galleries:
 National Gallery of Australia
 Art Gallery of NSW
 Queensland Art Gallery
 Art Gallery of South Australia
 Tasmanian Museum and Art Gallery
 Art Gallery of Western Australia
 Queen Victoria Museum and Art Gallery
 Museum and Art Gallery of the Northern Territory
 Museum of Contemporary Art
 Australian War Memorial in Canberra
 Auckland Art Gallery New Zealand
 Federation University Art Collection

Bibliography

References 

1917 births
1997 deaths
Australian artists
Wynne Prize winners
Blake Prize for Religious Art winners